Hypernauts is a proof of concept show produced by Foundation Imaging and Netter Digital Entertainment. To further prove that the computer-generated imagery and visual effects created in Babylon 5 were easily applied to other venues, the Hypernauts were born. ABC purchased thirteen episodes of the show from DIC Productions, L.P., eight of which ran on Saturday mornings for a single season in 1996 at 10:00 AM. ABC decided not to pick up the series for a second season, and did not air the five remaining episodes. The show was created and produced by Ron Thornton and Douglas Netter, its executive story editor was Christy Marx, who also wrote four episodes. Marx had previously written for both Babylon 5 and Captain Power. Another series writer was Katherine Lawrence who was nominated for a Writers Guild of America Award due to her script for Ice Bound.

Plot
Due to its lineage, Hypernauts featured relatively detailed designs of its technology and its aliens, as well as a fairly intricate plot, especially for a Saturday morning children's series. The premise of the series was that three cadets from the Academy of Galactic Exploration become lost in a Hyper Bubble (hyperspace) mid-jump and must band together with an alien named Kulai in order to survive in an unfamiliar part of the galaxy. Kulai (unbeknownst to the cadets) is a Chalim priestess from a planet called Pyria, a planet that was strip-mined by a warlike race called the Triiad, led by the Pyran traitor, Paiyin. The sole purpose of the Triiad is to wipe out intelligent races, and in the process acquire raw materials from their destroyed planets to continually create new war machines using automated self-replicating factory ships called "Makers".

The Hypernauts, as they are called in the academy, cannot match the Triiad's firepower with their own so they must rely on stealth, wits and (occasionally) their modified 'mech suits' in order to escape the Triiad. They are based in an ancient abandoned exploration ship called the Star Ranger which is hidden in an asteroid field, the Star Ranger's obsolete AI is named Horten. For long range missions they use a four-person "jump" ship called the Flapjack which is Hyper Bubble capable but has a short range unlike a full-fledged exploration ship. They use the "StarRanger" as a mother ship (with fusion engines) and with its vast database of explored nearby planets, they continue exploring (as they are trained to).

After learning of the Hypernauts (from their first encounter with Paiyin), the Triiad have activated and englobed the central region of the Milky Way Galaxy in a sensor net called "The Sphere of Interception", which can identify any end-to-end destination point for any hyperspace jump passing in and out of it (which includes any form of communication) so returning/calling home would lead the Triiad directly to Earth. The Hypernauts must keep the location of Earth a secret and somehow try to warn Earth of the Triiad's existence.

Hypernauts characters

Ace
Russell 'Ace' Antonov (Glenn Herman) is the team's "ace' pilot who joined to Max and Sharkey on the discipline mission as a punishment for using the Academy of Galactic Exploration's sim trainer to play war games. Ace pilots the team's shuttle known as the "Flapjack" on excursions away from the Star Ranger, and is also the team's best mech pilot.

Max
Noriko 'Max' Matsuda (Heidi Lucas) is the team medic who was sent on the disciplinary mission that stranded the three Hypernauts because of unauthorized calls to her sister. Legally separated from her family to join the Academy, Max joined the Academy in defiance of the wishes and beliefs of her people, the isolationist and xenophobic Caduceus Enclave.

Sharkey
Ricardo 'Sharkey' Alvarez (Marc Brandon Daniel) is the team's engineer and computer technician who was placed on the disciplinary mission after hacking into the Academy's mainframe. As a child, Sharkey was injured in an accident that killed his parents. Unresolved trauma from this incident led to Sharkey's claustrophobia.

Gloose
Gloose is a three legged alien found on a planet decimated by the Triiad and kept as a pet on board the Star Ranger.

Horten
Horten (Lewis Arquette) is the Star Ranger's discrete AI. He is used to control and monitor the systems of the ship.

Kulai
Kulai (Carrie Dobro) is the last Chalim (spiritual leader) from Pyrus. She joined the Hypernauts as a friend and mentor due to the help they provided in the conflict with Paiyin. The average Pyran lives about 300 years. Kulai is 342 and has an extended lifespan which is a part of the unique abilities with which she was born and which make her a Chalim, so she will probably live another 200 years. Pyrans share a common psychic bond, a sense of shared existence. The presence of a Chalim generates a critical element of the bond which keeps the race strong, healthy and able to procreate. Without a Chalim, the Pyran race would lack a crucial psychic catalyst. No matter where she is, Kulai can sense whether or not her people continue to exist, and they, to a lesser degree, can sense her existence.

Paiyin
Paiyin (Ron Campbell) was decreed a traitor after he betrayed his people to the Triiad, and facilitated the destruction of his own homeworld. He now serves the Triiad.

Episodes
The following is a complete list of episode titles for Hypernauts, in original broadcast order. The broadcasts aired on successive Saturday mornings on ABC. Episode descriptions courtesy of Hypernauts On the Net and Christy Marx.com.

Multimedia
Reunion, Hole in the Sky, New Alliances, and the Challenge parts one and two never aired in the United States, but were available on various media in Australia, Japan and Germany. In Japan Hypernauts was released as Voyager on VHS.

Production credits
 Executive Producers: Andy Heyward, Michael Malliani, Robby London
 Story Editors: John Sandford
 Live Action Produced by: Marsha Goodman
 Executive in charge of production: Brain A. Miller
 Cast: Jan Knoots, Marsha Goodman, Jabeel White, Phil Harnage
 International Executive Producers: Jean Chaplon
 Created by: Danny Florman
 Based on the Hypernauts book by Maranget Goodman

References

External links
 DIC Entertainment: Hypernauts homepage
 

1996 American television series debuts
1996 American television series endings
1990s American children's television series
1990s American science fiction television series
American children's science fiction television series
American television shows featuring puppetry
American Broadcasting Company original programming
Space adventure television series
Television series by DIC Entertainment
Television series by DHX Media
Works by Len Wein
Television series created by Christy Marx
Internet memes